The No Way Out Digital Sampler is a three-track EP that was released on March 10, 2009, by Phoenix, Arizona pop rock band This Century.

Track listing

Personnel
Members
 Joel Kanitz – Vocals
 Sean Silverman – Guitar
 Alex Silverman – Bass, keyboard
 Ryan Gose – Drums

References

External links 
 
 Facebook
 Twitter
 Youtube

2009 EPs